Virola elongata (syn. Virola theiodora  ) is a species of tree in the family Myristicaceae. The tree is native to Panama, Guyana, Brazil (Acre, Amazonas, Mato Grosso, Pará, Rondônia and Roraima), Bolivia, Colombia, Ecuador and Peru. It is also found in Suriname.

The Yanomami people use the powdered resin as an entheogen known as nyakwána which is inhaled or "snuffed" into the nasal cavity, it contains a high concentration of 5-MeO-DMT and DMT.

Virola elongata extracts have weak antibacterial activity against Enterococcus faecalis and Staphylococcus aureus.

Fruit and seeds

References

Entheogens
elongata
Medicinal plants
Flora of Brazil
Flora of Bolivia
Flora of Colombia
Flora of Ecuador
Flora of Guyana
Flora of Panama
Flora of Peru
Flora of Suriname
Flora of Rondônia
Flora of the Amazon